The Oakhurst Historic District is a historic district in Fort Worth, Texas. It was added to the National Register of Historic Places on February 24, 2010.

Photo gallery

See also

National Register of Historic Places listings in Tarrant County, Texas

References

External links

National Register of Historic Places in Fort Worth, Texas
Historic districts in Fort Worth, Texas
Historic districts on the National Register of Historic Places in Texas